A garden party is a gathering of people at an outdoor venue, particularly of social elites.

Garden Party may also refer to:

Film and television
The Garden Party, a 1973 short film by Jack Sholder
Garden Party (2008 film), a film starring Vinessa Shaw and Willa Holland 
Garden Party (2017 film), a CG animated short film
"Garden Party" (The Office), an episode of The Office
"The Garden Party", an episode from season 1 of the animated television series The Boondocks

Music
Garden Party (album), a 1972 album by Rick Nelson
"Garden Party" (Rick Nelson song), a song from the album
"Garden Party" (Marillion song), released by Marillion in 1983
"Garden Party", a song by Mezzoforte, from the 1982 album Surprise Surprise
Garden Party (festival), an Irish music festival

Other uses
The Garden Party (play), a 1963 play by Václav Havel
The Garden Party (short story collection), a 1922 collection of short stories by Katherine Mansfield
"The Garden Party" (short story), a story from the collection
 Rosa 'Garden Party', a hybrid tea rose cultivar
 An alternative name for the 1633 Rubens painting The Garden of Love

See also